John Robinson (18 April 1936 – June 2019) was an English professional footballer who played as a winger.

Career
Born in Chorley, Robinson originally played for Leyland Motors before signing for Bury in 1954. Deployed as an outside right, he scored 21 goals in a total of 127 appearances for the club before joining Oldham Athletic in 1961.

Robinson died in early June 2019, at the age of 83.

References

1936 births
2019 deaths
Association football wingers
English Football League players
English footballers
Bury F.C. players
Oldham Athletic A.F.C. players
Sportspeople from Chorley